Anti-Iranian sentiment, also known as Anti-Persian sentiment, Persophobia, or Iranophobia, is feelings and expression of hostility, hatred, discrimination, or prejudice towards Iran (historically known as Persia in the Western world) and its culture and towards persons based on their association with Iran and Iranian culture. Its opposite is Persophilia.

Historically, prejudice against the Iranian people (and ethnic Persians in particular) was prominent in the Arab world, particularly following the Arab invasion of Iran and the collapse of the Sasanian Empire in the 7th century.

In the Arab world

"Ajam"
The word "ʻajam" is derived from the root ʻ-J-M and refers to "unclear, vague and/or incomprehensible" as opposed to "ʻarabi", which means "clear, understandable; with perfect Arabic tongue". ʻAjam came to mean "one who mumbles" or “has difficulty speaking”, similar to the Slavic ethnonym and their usage of "mutes" to refer to Germans. It came to be "applied especially to Persians", and the distinction of the two terms is found already in pre- and early Islamic literature (ʻAjam Temtemī). "In general, ajam was a pejorative term, used by Arabs because of their contrived social and political superiority in early Islam.", as summarized by Clifford Bosworth. Although Arabic dictionaries state that the word ʻajami is used for all non-Arabs, the designation was primarily used for Persians.

Other slurs
Many Sunni fundamentalist Arabs use slurs against Persians by calling them "fire worshippers" and "majus".  Majus or majusi (ماجوس) is an Arabic term for the Magi in Zoroastrianism.

Anti-Iranianism in the early Islamic period
Patrick Clawson states, "The Iranians chafed under Umayyad rule. The Umayyads rose from traditional Arab aristocracy. They tended to marry other Arabs, creating an ethnic stratification that discriminated against Iranians. Even as Arabs adopted traditional Iranian bureaucracy, Arab tribalism disadvantaged Iranians."

Many Arab Muslims believed that Iranian converts should not clothe themselves as Arabs, and many other forms discrimination that existed. Mu'awiyah, in a famous letter addressed to Ziyad ibn Abih, the then governor of Iraq, wrote:

Mistreatment of Iranians and other non-Arabs during the early period of Islam is well documented. Under the Umayyads, many mawlas (non-Arab Muslims) employed by a patron enjoyed favourable positions as equal to Arab Muslims, but they were generally victims of cultural bias and even sometimes considered to be on an equal footing of a slave. According to sources of that time, the mistreatment of mawlas was a general rule. They were denied any positions in the government under Umayyad rule.

The Umayyid Arabs are even reported to have prevented the mawali from having kunyahs, as an Arab was only considered worthy of a kunya. They were required to pay taxes for not being an Arab:

References in Persian literature
Zarrinkoub presents a lengthy discussion on the large flux and influence of the victorious Arabs on the literature, language, culture and society of Persia during the two centuries following the Islamic conquest of Persia in his book Two Centuries of Silence.

Suppression of Iranian languages
After the Islamic conquest of the Sassanid Empire, during the reign of the Ummayad dynasty, the Arab conquerors imposed Arabic as the primary language of the subject peoples throughout their empire. Not happy with the prevalence of the Iranian languages in the divan, Hajjāj ibn Yusuf ordered the official language of the conquered lands to be replaced by Arabic, sometimes by force. According to Biruni

It is difficult to imagine the Arabs not implementing anti-Persian policies in the light of such events, writes Zarrinkoub in his famous Two Centuries of Silence, where he exclusively writes of this topic. Reports of Persian speakers being tortured are also given in al-Aghānī.

Shia Islam and Iranians

Predominantly-Shia Islamic Iran has always exhibited a sympathetic side for Ali (the cousin and son-in-law of Muhammad) and his progeny. Even when Persia was largely Sunni, that was still evident, as can be seen from the writings remaining from that era. Rumi for example praises Ali in a section entitled "Learn from ʻAli". It recounts Ali's explanation as to why he declined to kill someone who had spit in his face as ʻAli was defeating him in battle. Persian literature in praise of Ali's progeny is quite ubiquitous and abundant. These all stem from numerous traditions regarding Ali's favor of Persians being as equals to Arabs.

Several early Shiite sources speak of a dispute arising between an Arab and an Iranian woman. Referring the case to ʻAli for arbitration, ʻAli reportedly did not allow any discrimination between the two to take place. His judgment thus invited the protest of the Arab woman. Thereupon, ʻAli replied, "In the Qurʼan, I did not find the progeny of Ishmael (the Arabs) to be any higher than the Iranians."

In another such tradition, Ali was once reciting a sermon in the city of Kufah, when Ash'as ibn Qays, a commander in the Arab army protested, "Amir-al-Momeneen! These Iranians are excelling the Arabs right in front of your eyes and you are doing nothing about it!" He then roared, "I will show them who the Arabs are!" Ali immediately retorted, "While fat Arabs rest in soft beds, the Iranians work hard on the hottest days to please God with their efforts. And what do these Arabs want from me? To ostracize the Iranians and become an oppressor! I swear by the God that splits the nucleus and creates Man, I heard the prophet once say, just as you strike the Iranians with your swords in the name of Islam, so will the Iranians one day strike you back the same way for Islam."

When the Sassanid city of Anbar fell to the forces of Mu'awiyeh, news reached Ali that the city had been sacked and plundered spilling much innocent blood. Early Shi'ite sources report that Ali gathered all the people of Kufa to the mosque and gave a fiery sermon. After describing the massacre, he said, "If somebody hearing this news now faints and dies of grief, I fully approve of it!" According to Kasraie, It is from here that Ali is said to have had more sympathy for Iranians while author S. Nureddin Abtahi claims that Umar highly resented them. However, a hadith on Ali's banning of the game of shatranj (chess), narrates that Ali said "Chess is the gambling game of the Ajam"

Modern times

Iraq
It was in Baghdad where the first Arab nationalists, mainly of Palestinian and Syrian descent, formed the basis of their overall philosophies. Prominent among them were individuals such as Mohammad Amin al-Husayni (the Mufti of Jerusalem) and Syrian nationalists such as Shukri al-Quwatli and Jamil Mardam. Sati' al-Husri, who served as advisor to the Ministry of Education and later as Director General of Education and Dean of the College of Law, was particularly instrumental in shaping the Iraqi educational system. Other prominent Pan-Arabists were Michel Aflaq and Khairallah Talfah, as well as Sati' al-Husri, Salah al-Din al-Bitar, Zaki al-Arsuzi and Sami Shwkat (brother of Naji Shawkat). These individuals formed the nucleus and genesis of true pan-Arabism.

Sati' al-Husri's campaigns against schools suspected of being positive towards Persia are well documented. One dramatic example is found in the 1920s when the Iraqi Ministry of Education ordered Husri to appoint Muhammad Al-Jawahiri as a teacher in a Baghdad school. A short excerpt of Husri's interview with the teacher is revealing:

 "Husri: First, I want to know your nationality.
 Jawahiri: I am an Iranian.
 Husri: In that case we cannot appoint you."

Saddam Hussein forced out tens of thousands of people of Persian origin from Iraq in the 1970s, after having been accused of being spies for Iran and Israel. Today, many of them live in Iran.

Iran–Iraq War
Early on in his career, Saddam Hussein and pan-Arab ideologues targeted the Arabs of southwest Iran in an endeavour to have them separate and join 'the Arab nation.' Hussein made no effort to conceal Arab nationalism in his war against Iran (which he called "the second Battle of al-Qādisiyyah). An intense campaign of propaganda during his reign meant that many school children were taught that Iran provoked Iraq into invading and that the invasion was fully justified.

"Yellow revolution", "yellow wind", "yellow storm" were thrown as slurs by Saddam Hussein against Iran due to Hulagu's 1258 sack of Baghdad during the Mongol wars and the terms "Persian" and "Elamites" were also used by Saddam as insults.

On 2 April 1980, a half-year before the outbreak of the war, Saddam Hussein visited Al-Mustansiriya University in Baghdad. By drawing parallels to the 7th-Century defeat of Persia in the Battle of al-Qādisiyyah, he announced:

 "In your name, brothers, and on behalf of the Iraqis and Arabs everywhere, we tell those [Persian] cowards who try to avenge Al-Qadisiyah that the spirit of Al-Qadisiyah as well as the blood and honor of the people of Al-Qadisiyah who carried the message on their spearheads are greater than their attempts."

Saddam also accused Iranians of "murdering the second (Umar), third (Uthman) and fourth (Ali) Caliphs of Islam", invading the three islands of Abu Musa and Greater and Lesser Tunbs in the Persian Gulf and attempting to destroy the Arabic language and civilization.

In the war, Iraq made extensive use of chemical weapons (such as mustard gas) against Iranian troops and civilians as well as Iraqi Kurds. Iran expected a condemnation by UN of this act and sent allegation to UN. At time (-1985) the UN Security Council issued statements that "chemical weapons had been used in the war." However, in these UN-statements Iraq was not mentioned by name, so that the situation is viewed as "in a way, the international community remained silent as Iraq used weapons of mass destruction against Iranian as well as Iraqi Kurds" and it is believed that the United States had prevented UN from condemning Iraq.

In December 2006, Hussein said he would take responsibility "with honour" for any attacks on Iran using conventional or chemical weapons during the 1980–1988 war, but he took issue with charges he ordered attacks on Iraqis.

On the execution day, Hussein said, "I spent my whole life fighting the infidels and the intruders, [...] I destroyed the invaders and the Persians." He also stressed that the Iraqis should fight the Americans and the Persians. Mowaffak al Rubiae, Iraq's National Security adviser, who was a witness to Hussein's execution described him as repeatedly shouting "down with Persians." Hussein built an anti-Iranian monument called Hands of Victory in Baghdad in 1989 to commemorate his declaration of victory over Iran in the Iran-Iraq war (though the war is generally considered a stalemate). After his fall, it was reported that the new Iraqi government had organized the Committee for Removing Symbols of the Saddam Era and that the Hands of Victory monument had begun to be dismantled. However, the demolition was later halted.

2019 protests
Since 2019, anti-Iranian unrest has spiked in Iraq as Iran was blamed for sectarianism and political interferences. This has transcended into football during the 2022 FIFA World Cup qualification, with Iran and Iraq shared each win after two games.

After the overthrow of Saddam Hussein, these two Shia countries have built close relations.

United Arab Emirates

Persian Gulf naming dispute

The name of the Persian Gulf has become contested by some Arab countries since the 1960s in connection with the emergence of pan-Arabism and Arab nationalism, resulting in the invention of the toponym "Arabian Gulf" (used in some Arab countries), "the Gulf" and other alternatives such as the "Gulf of Basra", as it was known during the Ottoman rule of the region.

Saudi Arabia

Al-Salafi magazine, quoted in The Times, states, "Iran has become more dangerous than Israel itself. The Iranian Revolution has come to renew the Persian presence in the region. This is the real clash of civilizations."

In response to accusations made by Iran's supreme leader Ayatollah Ali Khamenei that Saudi authorities were responsible for killing Muslims injured during the 2015 Mina stampede, Abdul-Aziz ibn Abdullah Al ash-Sheikh, Grand Mufti of Saudi Arabia, stated in 2016 that Iranian leaders are descendants of Zoroastrians and are "not Muslims."

Bahrain

Since the Islamic Revolution, Bahrain and Iran have always been tense. In 1981, Bahraini Shia fundamentalists orchestrated a coup attempt under the auspices of a front organisation, the Islamic Front for the Liberation of Bahrain in hope to install an Iran-based cleric to rule Bahrain. Since then, two countries do not enjoy strong relations. Iran's support for the March 2011 protests in Bahrain increased tensions between Bahrain and Iran, with Bahrain accused Iran of funding the protests to destabilize the island. Eventually, Bahrain cut ties with Iran in 2016 following the 2016 attack on the Saudi diplomatic missions in Iran and Iranian threat to Bahrain.

During the 2002 World Cup qualification between Bahrain and Iran, Bahrain beat Iran 3–1, thus Iran lost the chance to qualify directly for the World Cup to rival Saudi Arabia. Bahrainis had waved flag of Saudi Arabia to demonstrate its solidarity with the Saudis and open anti-Iranian sentiment. The same thing occurred 20 years later, with Bahrainis whistled Iranian anthem and jeered Iranian team. The match also ended with a Bahraini victory.

Kuwait

Kuwaitis of Iranian ancestry are often discriminated and subjected to xenophobic hate campaigns. The anti-preservation attitude of the Kuwaiti government towards the Persian language will eventually lead to the disappearance of the language in the Kuwaiti society, as Abdulmuhsen Dashti projects. The government of Kuwait tries to delegitimise the use of the language in as many domains as possible.

The Persian language has been considered a significant threat to the dominant Sunni Arab society. In 2012, MP Muhammad Hassan al-Kandari called for a "firm legal action" against an advertisement for teaching the Persian language in Kuwait. The Kuwaiti TV series Karimo received criticism for showing Kuwaiti actors speaking fluent Persian; with some racist voices claiming it was a dictated enforcement of "Iranian culture" on the Kuwaiti society.

The generation of young Kuwaiti Ajam born between 1983 and 1993 are reported to have a minimal proficiency in the language unlike the older generations of Kuwaiti Ajam. Many Ajam parents reported unwillingness to pass the language to young generations for pragmatic reasons, as it will hurdle integration into the xenophobic dominant culture. Kuwait is one of the most xenophobic countries in the world. The Ajam feel pressure to abandon ties that could be interpreted as showing belonging to other countries, in this case Iran, as Persian is synonymous with Iranian for a lot of Kuwaitis, and the Persian language is actually called Iranian in Kuwaiti Arabic. In several interviews conducted by PhD student Batoul Hasan, Ajam youth have shown hesitation to use or learn Persian due to stigmatisation and prejudice in Kuwait. One person said: "We live in an Arab country where Arabic is the main language and Eimi has no place in this society.", "Speaking Eimi is a sensitive issue that could erupt. It would be more acceptable to speak Israeli (Hebrew) in public, but when you speak Farsi due to societies prejudices you are asking for problems". Many thought that Persian has no place and no use in the Kuwaiti society, as Arabic is the language of Kuwait (according to them). Multilingualism was not favourable, in the eyes of people interviewed by Batoul, unless it involved the acquisition of Arabic and English. Some people even believed that the acquisition of Kuwaiti Persian as a first or second language may affect the acquisition of Arabic.

Lebanon

The 2019–20 Lebanese protests saw Iran and its ally Hezbollah got antagonized by Lebanese protesters over the increasing economic decline and Iranian meddling on Lebanese sectarian system.

Jordan

The outbreak of Iranian Revolution and subsequent establishment of an Islamic regime in Iran changed drastically relationship from positive to negative. Jordan immediately backed Saddam Hussein on the Iran–Iraq War of 1980s and Iran severed diplomatic tie with Jordan aftermath. Due to Jordan's support for Iraq, even during the Gulf War, it took a decade before Iran and Jordan could normalize its relations.

Furthermore, Jordanian solidarity with majority of its Gulf allies have further strained relationship with Iran and increases anti-Iranian sentiment. Jordan has strongly opposed Iranian influence in Iraq and Syria, and has sought to work with Saudi Arabia, Israel and Russia to remove Iranian influence.

In 2017, Jordan summoned Iranian envoy over its political remarks calling for anti-kingdom uprisings among Arab countries.

Al-Qaeda
Ayman al-Zawahiri, leader of Al-Qaeda since 2011, has increasingly singled out Iran and Shia Muslims in his messages over the years, claiming in 2008 that "Persians" are the enemy of Arabs and that Iran cooperated with the U.S. during the occupation of Iraq.

In the United States

The Iranian hostage crisis of the US embassy in Tehran in November 1979 precipitated a wave of anti-Iranian sentiment in the United States, against the new Islamic regime and Iranian nationals and immigrants. Even though such sentiments gradually declined after the release of the hostages at the start of 1981. In response, some Iranian immigrants to the US have distanced themselves from their nationality and instead identify primarily on the basis of their ethnic or religious affiliations.

According to the Public Affairs Alliance of Iranian Americans (PAAIA), nearly half of Iranian Americans surveyed in 2008 by Zogby International have themselves experienced or personally know another Iranian American who has experienced discrimination because of their ethnicity or country of origin. The most common types of discrimination reported are airport security, social discrimination, employment or business discrimination, racial profiling and discrimination at the hands of immigration officials.

For three decades (starting in 1979), a BBQ restaurant in Houston, Texas hung an anti-Iranian poster featuring a re-enactment of lynching. This restaurant poster has drawn both protesters and fans to the restaurant in 2011.

Neda Maghbouleh is an American-born Canadian sociologist and author, with a focus on the racialization of migrants from Iran, as well as the entire Middle Eastern and North African region.

In January 2020, the fear of “Iranophobia” has raised in the Iranian-American community by the US killing of top Iranian commander Qassem Soliemani led to an intensifying crisis between Iran and the United States. Following some reactions of the United States including, patrols of Law enforcement in streets Lily Tajaddini, an Iranian-American activist in Washington, DC, declared “Posts like this insinuate that Iran is a terrorist country and thus Iranians are terrorists. It makes people feel scared to say they are Iranian in fear of how others might react”.The news tells people that Iranians are terrorists.

A survey conducted by the Public Affairs Alliance of Iranian Americans (a non-profit for Iranian Americans) mentioned that "more than 50 percent of Iranian Americans oppose any kind of action by the US against Iran". Mana Kharrazi, an Iranian-American community organizer reported that violent reactions on Iran were not accepted by some parts of the Iranian-American community.

Hollywood's film depiction
Since the 1980s and especially since the 1990s, Hollywood's depiction of Iranians has vilified Iranians as in television programs such as 24, John Doe, On Wings of Eagles (1986), and Escape From Iran: The Canadian Caper (1981), which was based on a true story. Critics maintain that Hollywood's "tall walls of exclusion and discrimination have yet to crumble when it comes to the movie industry's persistent misrepresentation of Iranians and their collective identity". In March 2013, Iran complained to Hollywood about various films, such as Ben Affleck's Oscar-winning Argo, that portray the country in an unrealistically negative light.

For decades, U.S. entertainment companies have been tried to illustrate Iran as a bloodthirsty country concerned about "bringing down America".

Not Without My Daughter (1991)
The 1991 film Not Without My Daughter was criticized for its portrayal of Iranian society. Filmed in Israel, it was based on the autobiography by Betty Mahmoody. In the book and film, an American woman (Mahmoody) traveled to Tehran with her young daughter to visit her Iranian-born family of her husband. Mahmoody's husband then undergoes a strange transformation in Iran, ranging from an educated and sophisticated citizen to an abusive, backwards peasant, eventually deciding that they will not return to the United States. Betty is told that she can divorce him and leave, but their daughter must stay in Tehran under Islamic law. Ultimately, after 18 months in Iran, Betty and her daughter escape to the American embassy in Turkey.

Several Western critics, including Roger Ebert of the Chicago Sun Times and Caryn James of The New York Times, criticized the film for stereotyping Iranians as misogynistic and fanatical. According to Ebert, the film depicts Islamic society "in shrill terms", where women are "willing or unwilling captives of their men", deprived of "what in the West would be considered basic human rights". Furthermore, Ebert says, "No attempt is made—deliberately, I assume—to explain the Muslim point of view, except in rigid sets of commands and rote statements". Ebert then contends, "If a movie of such a vitriolic and spiteful nature were to be made in America about any other ethnic group, it would be denounced as racist and prejudiced."

According to Jane Campbell, the film "only serves to reinforce the media stereotype of Iranians as terrorists who, if not actively bombing public buildings or holding airline passengers hostage, are untrustworthy, irrational, cruel, and barbaric."

The film was also criticized in Iran. A 2002 Islamic Republic News Agency article claimed that the film "[made] smears...against Iran" and "stereotyped Iranians as cruel characters and wife-beaters". In a Finnish documentary, Without My Daughter, film maker Alexis Kouros tells Mahmoody's husband's side of the story, showing Iranian eyewitnesses accusing the Hollywood film of spreading lies and "treasons". Alice Sharif, an American woman living with her Iranian husband in Tehran, accuses Mahmoody and the filmmakers of deliberately attempting to foment anti-Iranian sentiment in the United States.

Alexander (2004)
The 2004 film Alexander by American director Oliver Stone has been accused of negative and inaccurate portrayal of Persians. In particular, according to historian Kaveh Farrokh, the Persian soldiers who fought at the Battle of Gaugamela are wrongly portrayed as unclean, disorganized, and wearing turbans, in contrast to the well-disciplined Greek army. The destruction of Persepolis was done by Alexander who is a hated figure in eyes of Iranians. According to Lloyd Llewellyn-Jones, Professor of Ancient History at Cardiff University: "Oliver Stone's movie Alexander (2004) displays all the familiar Orientalist notions about the inferiority and picturesqueness of Eastern societies. So much so, indeed, that in terms of its portrayal of East–West relationships, Alexander has to be seen as a stale cultural statement and a worn-out reflection of the continuing Western preoccupation with an imaginary exotic Orient."

300 (2007)
The 2007 film 300 by Zack Snyder, is an adaptation of Frank Miller's 1998 graphic novel, was criticized for its portrayal of combatants, perceived as racist, in the Persian army at the Battle of Thermopylae. Reviewers in the United States and elsewhere "noted the political overtones of the West-against-Iran story line and the way Persians are depicted as decadent, sexually flamboyant and evil in contrast to the noble Greeks". With bootleg versions of the film already available in Tehran with the film's international release and news of the film's surprising success at the U.S. box office, it prompted widespread anger in Iran. Azadeh Moaveni of Time reported, "All of Tehran was outraged. Everywhere I went yesterday, the talk vibrated with indignation over the film". Newspapers in Iran featured headlines such as "Hollywood declares war on Iranians" and "300 AGAINST 70 MILLION" (Iran's population). Ayende-No, an independent Iranian newspaper, said that "[t]he film depicts Iranians as demons, without culture, feeling or humanity, who think of nothing except attacking other nations and killing people". Four Iranian Members of Parliament have called for Muslim countries to ban the film, and a group of Iranian film makers submitted a letter of protest to UNESCO regarding the film's alleged misrepresentation of Iranian history and culture. Iran's cultural advisor to president Mahmoud Ahmadinejad has called the film an "American attempt for psychological warfare against Iran".

Moaveni identified two factors which may have contributed to the intensity of Iranian indignation over the film. First, she describes the timing of the film's release, on the eve of Norouz, the Persian New Year, as "inauspicious." Second, Iranians tend to view the era depicted in the film as "a particularly noble page in their history". Moaveni also suggests that "the box office success of 300, compared with the relative flop of Alexander (another spurious period epic dealing with Persians), is cause for considerable alarm, signaling ominous U.S. intentions".

According to The Guardian, Iranian critics of 300, ranging from bloggers to government officials, have described the movie "as a calculated attempt to demonise Iran at a time of intensifying U.S. pressure over the country's nuclear programme". An Iranian government spokesman described the film as "hostile behavior which is the result of cultural and psychological warfare". Moaveni reported that the Iranians she interacted with were "adamant that the movie was secretly funded by the U.S. government to prepare Americans for going to war against Iran".

Dana Stevens of Slate states, "If 300, the new battle epic based on the graphic novel by Frank Miller and Lynn Varley, had been made in Germany in the mid-1930s, it would be studied today alongside The Eternal Jew as a textbook example of how race-baiting fantasy and nationalist myth can serve as an incitement to total war. Since it is a product of the post-ideological, post-Xbox 21st century, 300 will instead be talked about as a technical achievement, the next blip on the increasingly blurry line between movies and video games.

Argo (2012)
Argo has not been shown in public in Iran. It narrates the story of the 1979 Iran hostage crisis and the rescue of six American diplomats by the Central Intelligence Agency. The film faced several reactions from supporters of the Islamic republic and opponents. The film was criticized for a negative portrayal of Iranians, including both revolutionaries and civilians.

In the Netherlands
In 2015, the requests of the Ministry of Education and Foreign Affairs of the Netherlands to monitor Iranian students has led to a situation that Iranian students cannot study at the University of Twente in the city of Enschede and Eindhoven University of Technology in the city of Eindhoven. The latter university had even asked the AIVD, the Dutch intelligence service, to monitor Iranian students. AIVD stated that it was not its duty to do so, and the University has decided to stop admitting any applicants from Iran, regardless of the degree sought. The Dutch government says that if fears the theft of sensitive nuclear technology that could assist the Iranian government in constructing nuclear weapons. After protests were lodged, the Dutch government announced again that Iranian students and the Dutch citizens of Iranian heritage are not allowed to study at many Dutch universities or go to some areas in the Netherlands.

Additionally, in 2008 several other universities stated that the government had prohibited them from admitting students from Iran, and technical colleges were not allowed to give Iranian students access to knowledge of nuclear technology. It was noted that it was the first time after the German occupation during the Second World War that ethnic-, religion- or racial-based restrictions were imposed in the Netherlands. Harry van Bommel, a parliamentarian of the Dutch Socialist Party (SP), condemned the berufsverbot, deliberately using a German word associated with the Second World War.

Although the Dutch authorities state that the UN security council's resolution 1737 (2006) authorises them and obliges all member states of the UN to take such a measure, it remains the only country to have done so.

On 3 February 2010, a court in The Hague ruled that the Dutch government's policy to ban Iranian-born students and scientists from certain master's degrees and from nuclear research facilities is overly broad and a violation of an international civil rights treaty.

In the Turkic world

Turkey
According to a 2013 survey, 75% of Turks look at Iran unfavorably against 14% with favorable views. Political scientist Shireen Hunter writes that there are two significant groups in Turkey that are hostile towards Iran: "the military establishment and the ultra-Kemalist elite" and the "ultranationalists with pan-Turkist aspirations" (such as the Grey Wolves). Canadian author Kaveh Farrokh also suggests that pan-Turkist groups (the Grey Wolves in particular) have encouraged anti-Iranian sentiments.

Historically, the Shia Muslims were discriminated in the Ottoman Empire as they were associated with their Iranian/Persian neighbors. In Turkey, relatively large communities of Turks, Kurds and Zazas are Alevi Shia, while some areas in Eastern Anatolia, notably Kars and Ağrı, are Twelver Shia.

Azerbaijan

Historic falsifications in the Republic of Azerbaijan, in relation to Iran and its history, are "backed by state and state backed non-governmental organizational bodies", ranging "from elementary school all the way to the highest level of universities".

As a result of the two Russo-Persian Wars of the 19th century, the border between what is present-day Iran and the Republic of Azerbaijan was formed. Although there had not been a historical Azerbaijani state to speak of in history, the demarcation, set at the Aras river, left significant numbers of what were later coined "Azerbaijanis" to the north of the Aras river. During the existence of the Azerbaijan SSR of the Soviet Union, pan-Turkist political elites of Baku who were loyal to the Communist cause, in tandem with Soviet-era historical revisionism and myth-building, invented a national history based on the existence of an Azeri nation-state that dominated the areas to the north and south of the Aras river, which was supposedly torn apart by an Iranian-Russian conspiracy in the Treaty of Turkmenchay of 1828. This "imagined community" was cherished, promoted and institutionalized in formal history books of the educational system of the Azerbaijan SSR and the post-Soviet Azerbaijan Republic. As the Soviet Union was a closed society, and its people were unaware of the actual realities regarding Iran and its Azeri citizens, the elites in Soviet Azerbaijan kept cherishing and promoting the idea of a "united Azerbaijan" in their activities. This romantic thought led to the founding of nostalgic literary works, known as the "literature of longing"; examples amongst this genre are, for instance, Foggy Tabriz by Mammed Said Ordubadi, and The Coming Day by Mirza Ibrahimov. As a rule, works belonging to the "literature of longing" genre were characterized by depicting the life of Iranian Azeris as a misery due to suppression by the "Fars" (Persians), and by narrating fictional stories about Iranian Azeris waiting for the day when their "brothers" from the "north" would come and liberate them. Works that belonged to this genre, as the historian and political scientist Zaur Gasimov explains, "were examples of blatant Azerbaijani nationalism stigmatizing the “division” of the nation along the river Araxes, as well as denunciations of economic and cultural exploitation of Iranian Azerbaijanis, etc." Gasimov adds: "an important by-product of this literary genre was strongly articulated anti-Iranian rhetoric. Tolerance and even support of this anti-Iranian rhetoric by the communist authorities were obvious."

During the Soviet nation building campaign, any event, both past and present, that had ever occurred in what is the present-day Azerbaijan Republic and Iranian Azerbaijan were rebranded as phenomenons of "Azerbaijani culture". Any Iranian ruler or poet that had lived in the area was assigned to the newly rebranded identity of the Transcaucasian Turkophones, in other words "Azerbaijanis".
According to Michael P. Croissant: "It was charged that the "two Azerbaijans", once united, were separated artificially by a conspiracy between imperial Russia and Iran". This notion based on illegitimate historic revisionism suited Soviet political purposes well (based on "anti-imperialism"), and became the basis for irredentism among Azerbaijani nationalists in the last years of the Soviet Union, shortly prior to the establishment of the Azerbaijan Republic in 1991.

In the Republic of Azerbaijan, periods and aspects of Iranian history are usually claimed as being an "Azerbaijani" product in a distortion of history, and historic Iranian figures, such as the Persian poet Nizami Ganjavi are called "Azerbaijanis", contrary to universally acknowledged fact. In the Azerbaijan SSR, forgeries such as an alleged "Turkish divan" and falsified verses were published in order to "Turkify" Nizami Ganjavi. Although this type of irredentism was initially the result of the nation building policy of the Soviets, it became an instrument for "biased, pseudo-academic approaches and political speculations" in the nationalistic aspirations of the young Azerbaijan Republic. In the modern Azerbaijan Repuiblic, historiography is written with the aim of retroactively Turkifying many of the peoples and kingdoms that existed prior to the arrival of Turks in the region, including the Iranian Medes.

According to professor of history George Bournoutian:

Bournoutian adds:

Since 1918, political elites with Pan-Turkist-oriented sentiments in the area that comprises the present-day Azerbaijan Republic have depended on the concept of ethnic nationalism in order to create an anti-Iranian sense of ethnicity amongst Iranian Azeris. According to political adviser Eldar Mamedov, "Anti-Iranian policies [have been] carried out by various Azerbaijani governments since the 1990s." Azerbaijan's second President Abulfaz Elchibey (1992–93) and his government has been widely described as pursuing Pan-Turkic and anti-Iranian policies. Iranian Azerbaijani intellectuals who have promoted Iranian cultural and national identity and put forth a reaction to early pan-Turkist claims over Iran's Azerbaijan region have been dubbed traitors to the "Azerbaijani nation" within the pan-Turkist media of the Republic of Azerbaijan.

In Israel
Anti-Iranian sentiment in Israel has been mostly the direct result of the establishment of the Islamic theocracy in Iran since 1979. However, most Israelis point their open hostility against the Islamic government rather than against normal Iranian citizens. Thus, anti-Iranian policies in Israel have been mostly owned by the conflict between the Islamic government of Iran and Israel, rather than the normal populace.

Russian Empire
In the 19th century, during the existence of the Russian Empire, Russians dealt with Iran as an inferior "Orient", and held its people in contempt whilst ridiculing all aspects of Iranian culture. The Russian version of contemporaneous Western attitudes of superiority differed however. As Russian national identity was divided between East and West and Russian culture held many Asian elements, Russians consequently felt equivocal and even inferior to Western Europeans. In order to stem the tide of this particular inferiority complex, they tried to overcompensate to Western European powers by overemphasizing their own Europeanness and Christian faith, and by expressing scornfully their low opinion of Iranians. The historian Elena Andreeva adds that this trend was not only very apparent in over 200 Russian travelogues written about Iran and published in the course of the 19th and early 20th centuries, but also in diplomatic and other official documents.

See also

 Anti-Kurdish sentiment
 Anti-Shi'ism
 Shia–Sunni relations
 1987 Mecca Massacre
 Culture of Iran
 Demographics of Iran
 History of Iran
 Human capital flight from Iran
 Iranian diaspora
 Islam in Iran
 Persophile
 Religion in Iran
 Freedom of religion in Iran
 Sectarian violence among Muslims

References

Further reading

 
 
 

Iranian
 
Iranian